Zoran  Marić (Serbian Cyrillic: Зоран  Mapић; born 21 February 1960) is a Serbian professional football manager and former player.

Club career
Born in Boka, SFR Yugoslavia, Marić represented local clubs Novi Sad and Vojvodina in his country. In January 1988, aged almost 29, he was allowed to leave the Iron Curtain nation and move to Spain, where he would remain until his retirement five years later, with Galician clubs Celta and Compostela.

Marić competed in La Liga with Celta and Compostela, amassing totals of 71 matches and 13 goals, before finishing his playing career in 1993.

International career
Marić earned two caps for Yugoslavia, both in 1983. He made his debut on 30 March in a 2–0 friendly win against Romania.

Managerial career
Marić became a manager in 1999, notably working with former sides Compostela and Vojvodina. On 19 May 2010, he won the 2009–10 Bosnian Cup while in charge of Bosnian Premier League club Borac Banja Luka, who he led from January to August 2010.

After Borac, he worked as the head coach of the Serbia U19 national team from 2011 to 2012, then managed Spartak Subotica, Proleter Novi Sad, Vojvodina again and Novi Pazar.

On 21 June 2019, Marić became the new manager of, at the time, First League of RS club Krupa. On 8 May 2020, the 2019–20 First League of RS season ended abruptly due to the COVID-19 pandemic in Bosnia and Herzegovina and by default, Krupa, led by Marić, were crowned league champions and got promoted back to the Bosnian Premier League. On 15 September 2020, he left Krupa due to poor results.

Personal life
Marić's son, Goran, was also a footballer and a striker. He too spent many years working in Spain, mainly with Celta B.

Honours

Manager
Borac Banja Luka 
Bosnian Cup: 2009–10

Krupa
First League of RS: 2019–20

References

External links

National team data 

1960 births
Living people
People from Sečanj
Yugoslav footballers
Serbian footballers
Association football forwards
Yugoslav First League players
RFK Novi Sad 1921 players
FK Vojvodina players
La Liga players
Segunda División players
RC Celta de Vigo players
SD Compostela footballers
Yugoslavia international footballers
Serbian expatriate footballers
Expatriate footballers in Spain
Serbian expatriate sportspeople in Spain
Serbian football managers
Serbian expatriate football managers
Expatriate football managers in Spain
Expatriate football managers in Bosnia and Herzegovina
Segunda División managers
Premier League of Bosnia and Herzegovina managers
SD Compostela managers
FK Vojvodina managers
FK Borac Banja Luka managers
FK Krupa managers